The Stuttgart Open (sponsored since 2022 by Hugo Boss and called BOSS Open) is an ATP Tour 250 series professional tennis tournament on the ATP Tour. Between 1970 and 1989, the Stuttgart Open was a Grand Prix tennis circuit event. From 1990 to 1999, the Stuttgart Open was an ATP Championship Series tournament. The Championship Series name was changed to ATP International Series Gold in 2000, and the Stuttgart Open was a part of this series from 2000–2001 and 2003–2008. In 2002, the Stuttgart Open was briefly demoted for one year to ATP International Series status, which was renamed to the ATP Tour 250 in 2009, and it has retained the classification ever since.

Held since 1916 in Stuttgart, Germany, the Stuttgart Open was played on clay up to and including 2014. Starting in 2015, the tournament is played on grass. Along with the move to grass courts, the tournament  is now staged in the week after the French Open finishes.

Under the sponsorship of Mercedes-Benz, the tournament champions were awarded a Mercedes car, in addition to the prize money.

Past finals

Singles

Doubles

See also
List of tennis tournaments

Notes

References

External links
 
 ATP tournament profile

 
Tennis tournaments in Germany
Clay court tennis tournaments
1916 establishments in Germany
Recurring sporting events established in 1916
Grass court tennis tournaments
20th-century establishments in Württemberg